Mohamed Haji Adan Elmi is a Somali politician currently serving as the Minister of Parliamentary Relations and Constitutional Affairs of Somaliland since December 2017.

See also

 Ministry of Parliamentary Relations and Constitutional Affairs
 Politics of Somaliland
 List of Somaliland politicians

References

Peace, Unity, and Development Party politicians
Living people
Government ministers of Somaliland
Year of birth missing (living people)